Kim Soo-hyun (born January 25, 1985), also known as Claudia Kim, is a South Korean actress and model. She has appeared in the television series Queen of the Game (2006–2007) and Marco Polo (2014–2016), as well as the films Avengers: Age of Ultron (2015), The Dark Tower (2017), Fantastic Beasts: The Crimes of Grindelwald (2018), and Behind Every Star (2022).

Early life
Kim was born as Kim Soo-hyun in South Korea, on January 25, 1985. She spent six years of her childhood in the United States before returning to South Korea. Her dream in middle school was to become an international lawyer, and in high school she hoped to become a TV anchor. She was inspired by watching CNN's headline news anchor Karuna Shinsho in Asia. She completed her studies abroad to continue her dream of becoming an anchor and entered Ewha Womans University as an International Studies (DIS) major. While enrolled, she worked as a reporter and announcer for three years in the school's English-language newspaper, Ewha Voice. She also worked as an intern reporter for The Korea Times and Arirang TV.

Career

Kim's interests in music, film, and other entertainment led her to participate in a Korea-China modeling competition in 2005, which she won top prize in. Kim was the first winner of the award who had never worked as a model.

Producer Oh Se-kang saw Kim on a morning talk show, which led to her acting debut in the television series Queen of the Game (2006). Kim plays Park Joo-won, a friend of Lee Shin-jeon (Joo Jin-mo) and a law firm's international lawyer who loves him. For the drama, she won the New Star award at the 2006 SBS Awards for Acting.

Kim went on to appear in supporting roles in medical drama Brain (2011) and spy comedy 7th Grade Civil Servant (2013), as well as a leading role in the sitcom Standby (2012). Kim gained international attention for her roles in Marco Polo (2014) and Avengers: Age of Ultron (2015).

Kim portrays Nagini in the 2018 film Fantastic Beasts: The Crimes of Grindelwald.

In 2019, Italian fashion house Max Mara invited her to attend the annual "Women in Film Gala", which has advocated for women and gender equality in the entertainment industry since 1973. Hence, she became the first Korean actress to the attend that event.

In March 2021, Kim signed with new agency YG Entertainment.

In 2023, Kim will appear in the 1945 historical drama Gyeongseong Creature, which will air on Netflix.

Personal life
Kim married Korean-American businessman Matthew Shampine on December 14, 2019, at the Hotel Shilla in Seoul. Kim is a pescetarian.

In April 2020, she announced that she was expecting her first child, and was 15 weeks pregnant. On October 1, she gave birth to her daughter.

Filmography

Film

Television

Awards and nominations

References

External links
 

 
 
 

1985 births
Living people
South Korean film actresses
South Korean television actresses
South Korean female models
Ewha Womans University alumni
South Korean expatriates in the United States
YG Entertainment artists
21st-century South Korean actresses
Actresses from Seoul